Jasurbek Yakhshiboev (born 24 June 1997) is an Uzbek professional footballer who plays as a right winger for Navbahor Namangan and the Uzbekistan national team.

Club career 
Yakhshiboev was born on 24 June 1997 in the Chinaz town in Tashkent Region, Uzbekistan. He joined the Pakhtakor Tashkent youth system at the age of 7.

Yakhshiboev started his professional career in 2016 and quickly progressed to become a regular player in the Pakhtakor Tashkent first team. In July 2019, he went on loan to AGMK for the second half of 2019 Uzbekistan Super League season. On 2020, Yakhshiboev joined Belarusian club Energetik-BGU on a season-long loan deal. On 19 March 2020 in a match against BATE Borisov, Yakhshiboev scored 2 goals for the club, which was on his debut. On 13 February 2021, he signed a two-and-a-half-year deal with Ekstraklasa club Legia Warsaw. He made his debut in the match against Wisła Kraków in Ekstraklasa.

On 30 August 2021 he joined Moldovan club Sheriff Tiraspol on loan. On 28 September 2021, he scored the first goal in an upset 2–1 victory over Real Madrid in the UEFA Champions League.

On 5 July 2022, Yakhshiboev terminated his contract with Legia by mutual consent.

International career 
In 2016, he played 3 matches and scored 1 goal for the Uzbekistan national under-20 football team. Since 2016, he has been playing for the Uzbekistan national under-23 football team. In January 2018, together with the Uzbekistan national under-23 football team, he won the 2018 AFC U-23 Championship.

Yakhshiboev debuted for the Uzbekistan national team on 18 May 2018 in a friendly match against Iran at the China Cup tournament.

Career statistics

Club

International

Honours
Shakhtyor Soligorsk
 Belarusian Premier League: 2020 
Legia Warsaw
 Ekstraklasa: 2020–21
Sheriff Tiraspol
 Moldovan Super Liga: 2021–22

Uzbekistan U23
 AFC U-23 Championship: 2018

References

1997 births
Living people
Association football midfielders
Uzbekistani footballers
Uzbekistani expatriate footballers
Uzbekistan youth international footballers
Uzbekistan international footballers
Footballers at the 2018 Asian Games
Asian Games competitors for Uzbekistan
Pakhtakor Tashkent FK players
FC AGMK players
FC Energetik-BGU Minsk players
FC Shakhtyor Soligorsk players
Legia Warsaw players
FC Sheriff Tiraspol players
Navbahor Namangan players
Uzbekistan Super League players
Belarusian Premier League players
Ekstraklasa players
Moldovan Super Liga players
Uzbekistani expatriate sportspeople in Belarus
Uzbekistani expatriate sportspeople in Poland
Uzbekistani expatriate sportspeople in Moldova
Expatriate footballers in Belarus
Expatriate footballers in Poland
Expatriate footballers in Moldova